Legio XIV Gemina ("The Twinned Fourteenth Legion") was a legion of the Imperial Roman army, levied by Julius Caesar in  57 BC. The cognomen Gemina (Twinned) was added when the legion was combined with another understrength legion after the Battle of Actium. The cognomen Martia Victrix (martial and victorious) was added following their service in the Pannonian War c. AD 9 and the defeat of Boudicca in AD 61. The emblem of the legion was the Capricorn, as with many of the legions levied by Caesar.

Under Caesar
Legio XIV was first raised by Caesar in Cisalpine Gaul during his raids into, and conquest of, Gaul.  Their enlistment term was for 16 years, as per the other Republican legions (though Augustus raised that to 20). In the first years, the legion frequently was left behind to guard the camp during battles and raids. Following its early destruction at Atuatuca (near today's Tongeren, Belgium) during Ambiorix's revolt it was immediately reconstituted. For years after the Massacre at Atuatuca carried out by the Eburones under Ambiorix together with Cativolcus they were viewed as an unlucky legion, but its honor had been preserved due to the efforts of their Aquilifer, Lucius Petrosidius.

Under Germanicus
This legion fought under General Germanicus Caesar against the Germanic leader Arminius.  A decade before this campaign, Arminius succeeded in wiping out three entire legions in the Battle of the Teutoburg Forest, one of the greatest disasters in Roman military history.  The legion secured a victory for Germanicus, and earned him a triumph from his adopted father and biological uncle, Emperor Tiberius.

Invasion of Britain
Stationed in Moguntiacum, Germania Superior from AD 9, Legio XIV Gemina Martia Victrix was one of four legions used by Aulus Plautius and Claudius in the Roman invasion of Britain in AD 43. It built its legionary fortress at Mancetter on Watling Street and by AD 58 it had moved its base to Wroxeter.

It took part in the defeat of Boudicca in 60 or 61. At the Battle of Watling Street the 14th defeated Boudicca's force of 230,000, according to Tacitus and Dio, with their meager force of 10,000 Legionaries and Auxiliaries.  This act secured them as Nero's "most effective" legion, and he kept them garrisoned in Britain during the next few years to keep the uneasy tribes in check.

In 67 AD the legion was sent to the Balkans in preparation for a campaign against the Parthians that Nero planned but which never materialised.

Rebellion on the Rhine
In AD 89 the governor of Germania Superior, Lucius Antonius Saturninus, rebelled against Domitian, with the support of the XIVth and of the XXI Rapax, but the revolt was suppressed.

When the XXIst legion was lost in AD 92, XIV Gemina was sent to Pannonia to replace it, setting up camp in Vindobona (Vienna). After a war with the Sarmatians and Trajan's Dacian Wars (101–106 AD), the legion was moved to Carnuntum, where it stayed for three centuries. Some vexillations or subunits of the Fourteenth fought in the wars against the Mauri, under Antoninus Pius, and the legion participated in the Parthian campaign of Emperor Lucius Verus. During his war against the Marcomanni, Emperor Marcus Aurelius based his headquarters in Carnuntum.

In support of Septimius Severus
In AD 193, after the death of Pertinax, the commander of the Fourteenth, Septimius Severus, was acclaimed emperor by the Pannonian legions, and above all by his own. XIV Gemina fought for its emperor in his march to Rome to attack usurper Didius Julianus (193), contributed to the defeat of the usurper Pescennius Niger (194), and probably fought in the Parthian campaign that ended with the sack of the capital of the empire, Ctesiphon (198).

In support of imperial candidates

In the turmoil following the defeat of Valerian, the XIV Gemina supported usurper Regalianus against Emperor Gallienus (260), then Gallienus against Postumus of the Gallic Empire (earning the title VI Pia VI Fidelis—"six times faithful, six times loyal"), and, after Gallienus' death, Gallic Emperor Victorinus (269–271).

5th century
At the beginning of the 5th century, XIV Gemina was still assigned at Carnuntum. It probably dissolved with the collapse of the Danube frontier in the 430s. The Notitia Dignitatum lists a Quartodecimani comitatensis unit under the Magister Militum per Thracias; it is possible that this unit is XIV Gemina.

Attested members

See also 

 List of Roman legions

References

Bibliography
 Mommsen, Theodor The History of Rome, Volume 1. 
 Pollard, Nigel & Berry, Joanne The Complete Roman Legions.
 Parker, H. M. D. The Roman Legions.
 Ireland, Stanley Roman Britain: A Sourcebook (Routledge Sourcebooks for the Ancient World), 3rd Edition.

External links
 Legio XIIII Gemina at livius.org

Roman legions in Britain
Roman legions
Comitatenses
Military units and formations established in the 1st century BC